Irfan Sajjad is a Bangladeshi model and actor. His break came when he won the 2013 season of reality show Fair and Handsome – The Ultimate Man. Since then he has appeared in numerous TV programs and several films.

Career
After winning reality show Fair and Handsome – The Ultimate Man, in 2013, Sajjad started his career as an actor in the last scene of telefilm Bhalobashar Golpo by Mabrur Rashid Bannah.   
He went on to act in many other telefilms and drama serials.

Sajjad made his big screen debut in director Alvi Ahmed's 2015 film U-Turn. His second film, released in 2016, was Mushfiqur Rahman Gulzar's low-budget Mon Jane Na Moner Thikana. He co-starred with Bidya Sinha Mim in Tania Ahmed's Bhalobasha Emoni Hoy, which was released on 27 January 2017.

Works

Television
 Unmarried (2016)
 Bideshi Bou (2016)
 Amar Biye (2017)
 Shada Kagoje Shajano Onuvuti (2017)
 Betar Bhalobasha Bachelor Point (2018)
 Rider Love Story (2022)
 Mon Poray (2022)
 Tabiz Kora Premik (2022)
 Poriname Tumi (2022)
 Colony Lover (2022)
 Nayok (2022)
 Ami Bhalobashi Toke (2022)
 Biye Korlei Shob Thik (2022)
 Songhar (2022)
 Notun Thikanay (2022)
 Seasonal Chor (2022)
 Good Night (2022)
 Ghurni (2022)
 Ki Kore Toke Bolbo (2022)
 Mohila Sublet Abosshok (2022)
 Social Media Syndrome (2022)
 Bhangoner Por (2022)
 Being Woman (2022)
 Prem Korite Icchuk (2022)
 Daring Wife Fearing Husband (2022)
 One Way (2022)
 Takar Machine (2022)
 Love and War (2022)
 Nila Dekechilo (2022)
 Sokal Bikal Ratri (2022)
 Tomake (2022)
 Shesh Bikeler Meye (2022)
 Sweet Sixteen (2022)
 Tomar Kacha Kachi (2022)
 Rupkothar Pathsaala (2022)
 Ebar Pujoy (2022)
 Aghaat (2022)
 Bhoy Korona (2022)
 Charulotar Nikhoj Songbad (2022)
 Shesher Agey (2022)
 Ex Jokhon Husband (2022)
 Naamhin Shomprko (2022)
 English Rana (2022)
 Ekti Pore Live A Ashchi (2022)
 Only Bou Is Real (2022)
 Rocky Bhai (2022)
 Bharprapto Boyfriend (2022)
 Moner Moto (2022)
 Ghumhin Rater Golpo (2022)

 Films 

Web series

 Short films 
 Commitment (2020)
 Ek Bhai Chompa (2021)
 Ki Ekta Obostha (2021)
 Proxy (2021)
 Jhilik (2021)
 Ar Theko Na Durey (2022)
 Oprokashito'' (2022)

References

External links
Bangla Movie Database

One of the Popular Drama of Irfan Sazzad

Bangladeshi male models
Bangladeshi male film actors
Living people
1989 births